Gallikos is a village and a former municipality in the Kilkis regional unit, Greece. Since the 2011 local government reform it is part of the municipality Kilkis, of which it is a municipal unit. The municipal unit has an area of 149.054 km2. Population 6,343 (2011). The seat of the municipality was in the village of Kampanis.

The municipality Gallikos was created after 13 small villages in the area south of the city of Kilkis merged in the late 1990s when the  Greek government implemented its Kapodistrias project to fuse - and thus limit  the number of - local authorities in the country.

Subdivisions

The following villages are part of the municipal unit:

Transport
The Village is served by Gallikos railway station on the Thessaloniki–Alexandroupoli line

References

Populated places in Kilkis (regional unit)

bg:Галик (дем)